Shepherds Find Zenobia on the Banks of the Araxes is an 1850 oil on canvas painting by William Bouguereau, now in the École nationale supérieure des Beaux-Arts.

Its subject is drawn from Tacitus's Histories (XII.51), in which Rhadamistus, king of Armenia, tried to kill his wife Zenobia to prevent her falling into enemy hands and then threw her into the river Araxes before riding on. Still alive, she was found by shepherds "in a quiet backwater", who bandaged her wounds and took her to Artaxata, whence she travelled on to meet Tiridates. 

Preparatory drawings for the work survive in the École des beaux-arts and the Musée d'Orsay. Paul Baudry won the main Prix de Rome for 1850, but Bouguereau won a consolation second prize, which he used to pay for a stay at the Villa Medici.

References

Paintings by William-Adolphe Bouguereau
1850 paintings
Paintings in the collection of the Beaux-Arts de Paris
Paintings based on works by Tacitus